Haplogroup K2b (P331), also known as MPS is a human y-chromosome haplogroup that is thought to be less than 3,000 years younger than K, and less than 10,000 years younger than F, meaning it probably is around 50,000 years old, according to the age estimates of Tatiana Karafet et al. 2014.

Basal K2b* has not been identified in living males. It has been found only in the remains of an individual known as Tianyuan man, who was alive some time between 42,000 and 39,000 years BP, during the upper paleolithic era, near the future site of Beijing, China. (For a time, the basal clade was also attributed, erroneously, to another individual, known as RISE94, who lived 3,000 years BP, in what is now Sweden. However, RISE94 is now known to belong to R1a.)

K2b1 (P397/P399) known previously as Haplogroup MS, and Haplogroup P (P-P295), also known as K2b2 are the only primary clades of K2b. The population geneticist Tatiana Karafet and other researchers (2014) point out that K2b1, its subclades and P* are virtually restricted geographically to South East Asia and Oceania. Whereas, in a striking contrast, P1 (P-M45) and its primary subclades Q and R now make up "the most frequent haplogroup in Europe, the Americas, and Central Asia and South Asia". According to Karafet et al., the estimated dates for the branching of K, K2, K2b and P point to a "rapid diversification" within K2 "that likely occurred in Southeast Asia", with subsequent "westward expansions" of P*, P1, Q and R.

According to a study by geneticist Spencer Wells, haplogroup K, from which haplogroup P descend, originated in the Middle East or Central Asia. It is likely that haplogroup P diverged somewhere in South-Central Asia into P1, which expanded into Siberia and Northern Eurasia, and into P2, which expanded into Oceania and Southeast Asia.

Phylogenetic structure 

 K2b (P331), also known as MPS.
 K2b1 (P397, P399), similar to the previous Haplogroup MS.
 Haplogroup S (B254) also known as K2b1a.
 Haplogroup M (P256) also known as K2b1b.
 Haplogroup P (P295/PF5866/S8) –  also known as K2b2.
 P1 (M45) – also known as K2b2a; descendant subclades include the major haplogroups Q and R. Distribution 
Basal K2b*, or K2b(xK2b1,P), has been found only in late paleolithic remains known as Tianyuan man, from central North China. Modern populations with living members of K2b1 all subclades), P* (P-P295*; K2b2*) and P2 (K2b2b) appear to be restricted to Oceania, South East Asia and Siberia.

Basal, un-mutated P1* (K2b2a*; P-M45*), in modern times, is distributed in isolated pockets, over an relatively wide area that includes Island South East Asia.

Some Negrito populations of South-East Asia carry next to noteworthy East Asian ancestry, very high levels of K2b at the subclade level. It is carried, for instance, by more than 83% of males among the Aeta (or Agta) people of the Philippines, in the form of K2b1 (60%), P* (P-P295*, a.k.a. K2b2*) and P2 (P-B253; K2b2b).

 K2b1 
K2b1 is found in 83% of males of Papua New Guinea, and up to 60% in the Aeta people of the Philippines. It is also found among other Melanesian populations, as well as indigenous Australians, and at lower levels amongst Polynesians. It is also found in the Melanesian populations of Indonesia.

Major studies of indigenous Australian Y-DNA, published in 2014 and 2015, suggest that about 29% of indigenous Australian males belong to subclades of K2b1. That is, up to 27% indigenous Australian males carry haplogroup S1a1a1 (S-P308; previously known as K2b1a1 or K-P308), and one study found that approximately 2.0% – i.e. 0.9% (11 individuals) of the sample in a study in which 45% of the total was deemed to be non-indigenous – belonged to haplogroup  M1 (M-M4; also known as M-M186 and known previously as haplogroup K2b1d1).  All of these males carrying M1 were Torres Strait Islanders. (The other Y-DNA haplogroups found were: basal K2* [K-M526], C1b2b [M347; previously Haplogroup C4], and basal C* [M130].)

 P (K2b2) 
Apart from the basal paragroup P* (K2b2), it has only one subclade: P1 (M45), also known as K2b2a – which is also the parent of the major haplogroups Q (K2b2a1) and R (K2b2a2).

P (K2b2) descendant haplogroups Q (K2b2a1) and R (K2b2a2) is widely distributed among males of Native American, Central Asian, South Asian and Siberian ancestry.

 Basal P* (K2b2*) 
P-P295* (sometimes known as "pre-P", before P-M45 was redesignated P1) is found among 28% of males among the Aeta, as well as in Timor at 10.8%, and one case may have been found in Papua New Guinea (Kaysar et al. 2006) although this has not been verified.

 P1 (K2b2a) 
P1 (M45/PF5962), also known as K2b2a, is hundreds of times more common than P* (K2b2; PxM45), as it includes haplogroups Q and R, is estimated as being 14,300 years younger than K2b.

Many ethnic groups with high frequencies of P1 are located in Central Asia and Siberia: 35.4% among Tuvans, 28.3% among Altaian Kizhi, and 35% among Nivkh males.

Modern South Asian populations also feature P1 at low to moderate frequencies. In South Asia it is most frequent among the Muslims of Manipur (33%), but this may be due to a very small sample size (nine individuals). Cases of P1 (M45) reported in South Asia may be unresolved cases or R2 or Q.

§ These may include members of haplogroup R2.''

See also 
 Ancient populations haplogroups are assumed from small ancient sample sizes.
 † Stands for assumed extinction (no living sample of the same haplogroup)
  Entire Phlogeny except for Hg X + distribution of K2b1 clades K2* clades and K2c+K2d, as well as P(xm45)
  Ancient dna.
  Modern Populations+Ancient Basques
  y-dna haplogroup X.

Notes 
Assuming
B70 ky for the TMRCA of M168 chromosomes,10 we estimate the
interval of time between the diversification of K-M9 and that of
K-P331 to be <3 ky. This rapid diversification has also been assessed
using whole Y-chromosome sequence data.22 In addition, we estimate
the total time between the common ancestor of K-M9 and that of
P-P295 to be <5 ky, and the time between the common ancestor
P-P295 and that of P-P27 to be 12.3 ky (95% CI: 6.6–20 ky).

References 

K2B